Ada Louise Comstock (December 11, 1876 – December 12, 1973) was an American women's education pioneer. She served as the first dean of women at the University of Minnesota and later as the first full-time president of Radcliffe College.

Early life and education
Ada Louise Comstock was born on December 11, 1876, in Moorhead, Minnesota, to Solomon Gilman Comstock, an attorney, and Sarah Ball Comstock. Her father recognized her capabilities and potential and set about to cultivate them by encouraging an early and sound education for his daughter. The oldest of three children, Comstock graduated from Moorhead High School at age 15.

Comstock began her undergraduate studies at the University of Minnesota in 1892, where she was a member of Delta Gamma woman's fraternity. After two years, she transferred to Smith College, graduating in 1897.

As a Smith student, Ada often questioned the established rules and norms of college life. While a resident of Hubbard House, she was given a case of champagne which the housemother felt should be given away. Instead, in what was characteristically her spirit, she decided to store it in the water cooler to refresh her friends.

She returned to Minnesota to complete a graduate course in teaching at Moorhead Normal School (now Minnesota State University, Moorhead), then went to Columbia University for graduate work in English, History, and Education, where she earned a master's degree in 1899.

Career

Comstock began her career at the University of Minnesota as an assistant in the rhetoric department under Maria L. Sanford. She was promoted to the position of instructor in 1900 and assistant professor in 1904. She was appointed the school's first dean of women in 1907 and a full professor in 1909.  In this capacity, she was instrumental in improving the quality of life for the women of the college, arguing persistently that a college was responsible for one's physical and intellectual well-being.

In 1912, Ada came to Smith as the first ever Dean of the College and to teach English. Particularly challenging to her was the opportunity to advise and teach young women in an all-female institution. One of the most important tenets of her educational philosophy was the inculcation in young women of self-respect, one aspect of which was knowing how to employ oneself. Ada believed very strongly throughout her entire life that a college education should inspire women to take a part in the shaping of the world. In 1917, when the Presidency of Smith College became vacant, Ada was given the responsibility of its operation for approximately 6 months, but was neither given the title of acting President nor was she considered for the position. Despite Ada's significant and numerous contributions to the College, Smith was not ready for its first woman President.

From 1921 to 1923, she served as president of the Association of Collegiate Alumnae, now known as the American Association of University Women. She was a founding member and one of the five American voting delegates to the first conference of the International Federation of University Women in London in 1920 and at the second in Paris in 1922. One of their objects was the forwarding of higher education for women in every country in the world. She was active in other areas in public life as well. In 1929 she was the only woman named by President Herbert Hoover to an eleven-person commission to study problems of law enforcement. She was a president of the American Academy of Arts and Sciences, Vice Chairman of the American Council of Institute of Pacific Relations and served on the National Committee for Planned Parenthood.

On October 20, 1923, Comstock was inaugurated as president of Radcliffe College. She spent 20 years leading the school, strengthening its academic programs and, in 1943, persuaded Harvard to accept classroom coeducation. Also under President Comstock, Radcliffe was able to launch a nationwide admission program, improve student housing, construct new classroom buildings and expand the graduate program. When Radcliffe celebrated its 75th anniversary in 1954, Comstock was called "the chief architect of the greatness of this college".

In addition to her academic career, Comstock was appointed to the National Committee on Law Observation and Enforcement, known as the Wickersham Commission, in 1929.

After her retirement from Radcliffe, Comstock remained active in academia, serving on the Smith board of trustees, working on a graduate center for Radcliffe, and traveling extensively in support of her husband's research.

Personal life
A week after her retirement from Radcliffe in 1943, Comstock married Yale professor emeritus Wallace Notestein. They had met in Minnesota decades before, but Comstock had focused on her academic career, as her father wished. Neither had married in the intervening years. Notestein died in 1969.

Death

Ada Comstock Notestein died of congestive heart failure at her home in New Haven, Connecticut, on December 12, 1973.

Legacy 
The largest collection of her papers, the Ada Louise Comstock Papers, 1897–1950, are housed at the Smith College Archives.

Comstock's name has been honored with buildings on college and university campuses, including Comstock Hall at the University of Minnesota, Comstock Hall in the Radcliffe Quad, and Comstock House residence hall at Smith College. Her full name has also been used for the title of Smith college's program for non-traditional students, as well as for a lecture series.

Her childhood home is maintained as a historic site by the City of Moorhead and the Minnesota Historical Society.

Awards and honors
1943: Fellow of the American Academy of Arts and Sciences
1958: Jane Addams Medal, Rockford College
1966: Founder's Award, Radcliffe College
1967: Hollins Medal

References

External links

Ada Louise Comstock papers at the Smith College Archives, Smith College Special Collections
Ada Comstock Distinguished Women Scholar Award & Lecture
Ada Comstock Scholars Program
Records of the President of Radcliffe College, 1923-1943: A Finding Aid. Schlesinger Library, Radcliffe Institute, Harvard University.
Papers, 1818, 1887-1982: A Finding Aid. Schlesinger Library, Radcliffe Institute, Harvard University.

1876 births
1973 deaths
People from Moorhead, Minnesota
American educational theorists
Fellows of the American Academy of Arts and Sciences
Presidents of Radcliffe College
Smith College alumni
University of Minnesota alumni
Deans of women